Conversations is the second studio album by American rock band Roses Are Red.

Track listing
 "White and Gold" (3:12)
 "I Felt I Knew Her" (3:22)
 "Time Signals Progress" (4:19)
 "Oceans" (4:11)
 "I Apologize" (3:30)
 "12:34" (1:29)
 "Silver Linings" (4:09)
 "300 Motion Pictures" (3:16)
 "You and Me Both" (3:58)
 "Conversations" (4:24)

Personnel
Vincent Minervino - vocals/piano
Michael Lasaponara - drums
Kevin Mahoney - bass guitar
Matthew Gordner - guitar
Brian Gordner - guitar

2004 albums
Roses Are Red (band) albums
Albums produced by Chris Badami